Mher Herberti Grigoryan (born 15 February 1972) is an Armenian politician currently serving as the Deputy Prime Minister of Armenia.

Biography

Education

Mher Grigoryan studied law at Moscow State University from 1989 to 1991. He continued his education at Yerevan State University, where he studied law from 1991 to 1994. From 1997 to 1998 he took a qualification course at Leeds University Business School.

Work experience

From 1994 to 1996 he was a private entrepreneur in the Russian Federation. In 1997, he started his career in the Central Bank of Armenia (CBA). From 1997 to 1999 he was the Head of the Legal Department of the CBA. He then continued his career in Armimpexbank (now Ameriabank), where from 1999 to 2005 he was the Head of Legal Service and Operational Director. Simultaneously, he provided advisory services to the World Bank from 2002 to 2006. He was a legal officer in the HSBC Bank from 2004 to 2005 and became the Executive Director of Inecobank in 2005, a position he held until 2007. From 2007 to 2011 Grigoryan was the Deputy CEO of VTB Bank Armenia. From 2006 to 2018 he was also a member of the board of ArCa Credit Reporting. He became the Chairman and CEO of Ardshinbank in 2011 and continued his career in this position until 2018. He was also the chairman of the board of Armenia Insurance Company from 2012 to 2018.

Political career 
On 12 May 2018, Grigoryan was appointed the Deputy Prime Minister of Armenia. Following the resignation of the Government on 16 October 2018, he became Acting Deputy Prime Minister of Armenia and on 16 January 2019, he was reappointed to the post of Deputy Prime Minister of Armenia.

Since January 2021, Grigoryan has represented Armenia in the trilateral working group of deputy prime ministers of Russia, Armenia and Azerbaijan for the restoration of transport links between Armenia and Azerbaijan as stipulated by the 2020 Nagorno-Karabakh ceasefire agreement.

Personal life

Grigoryan is married and has a son and a daughter.

Awards 

 Anania Shirakatsi Medal (Republic of Artsakh, 2016)
 Anania Shirakatsi Medal (Armenia, 2017)
 Medal for Contribution to the Development of the Eurasian Economic Union (Eurasian Economic Council, 2022)

References 

1972 births
Living people
Deputy Prime Ministers of Armenia
Alumni of the University of Leeds